The Old Kiln Light Railway is a  narrow gauge railway at the Rural Life Living Museum in Tilford, near Farnham, Surrey. It has a collection of historic locomotives and rolling stock including two steam locomotives. It operates on most weekends in the summer and occasionally certain midweek days during school half term.

History 

Founded in the early 1970s as a heritage Wey Valley Light Railway, it was first located around a disused pumping station in Farnham. In 1982 the land was sold for housing and the track and equipment were moved to the Old Kiln Museum, now known as the Rural Life Centre. The line has since lengthened around the centre and a small stretch of track serves the museum's heritage timber yard demonstration area.

Stations 

The railway has four stations: Reeds Road, Old Kiln Halt, Oatlands and Mills Wood. Reeds Road was built in 2003 to replace a sleeper-built platform, is the south-western terminus, has a passenger waiting room, a run-round loop and a siding for storing rolling stock.

Reeds Road is a terminus located close to the entrance to the Rural Life Living Museum's entrance on Reeds Road and features a platform with small wooden shelter, run-round loop and a pair of sidings used for wagon storage.  

Old Kiln Halt has a short platform and passenger shelter and is near the old schoolroom at the centre. The locomotive works and carriage sheds are here, along with further storage sidings. 

Oatlands was the far terminus of the line until extension to Mills Wood. It has a platform with a small waiting room with a stove. It is located behind the museum's playground and is sometimes used as the passenger boarding point during events. it was previously named "Waverley End Station".

Mills Wood is the other terminus of the line, on the north-east side of the Rural Life Centre. It has a waiting room partly built from the body of an old Portsdown and Horndean Light Railway passenger tram, a run-round loop and a connection to the woodyard operated by the Rustic Timber Group. Passengers typically board trains here on normal running days.

Steam locomotives

Internal combustion locomotives

Coaches

Wagons

Awards 
The OKLR received the "Surrey Industrial History Group Conservation" award in 1994

References

External links

 Official website
 Gallery of photographs at Narrow Gauge Heaven
 Facebook Page

2 ft gauge railways in England
Tourist attractions in Surrey
Heritage railways in Surrey